The Women's Points Race was one of the 8 under-23 women's events at the 2008 European Track Championships, held in Pruszków, Poland. The race was held on 6 September and 22 cyclists from 14 countries participated in the event.

Ellen van Dijk won the race ahead of Lizzie Armitstead and Aksana Papko.

Final results

DNF = did not finish
Sources

See also

 2008 European Track Championships – U23 Women's individual pursuit
 2008 European Track Championships – U23 Women's scratch

References

2008 European Track Championships
European Track Championships – U23 Women's points race